Don Smolenski is an American businessman who is the team president of the Philadelphia Eagles of the National Football League (NFL). He joined the franchise in 1998 as their chief financial officer before being promoted to his current role in 2012.

Smolenski grew up in Pittsford, New York. He attended Amherst College and Hartford University. In 1994, he was hired as the CFO of the International Hockey League. After five years in that position, he joined the Philadelphia Eagles of the National Football League (NFL). Smolenski served with the Eagles as their CFO from 1998 to 2009, then as their chief operating officer from 2010 to 2011 before being promoted to team president. He was part of the team that won the Super Bowl in 2017.

References

External links
Philadelphia Eagles bio

Philadelphia Eagles executives
People from Pittsford, New York
Year of birth missing (living people)
Living people
American chief financial officers
American sports executives and administrators
National Football League team presidents